Cislău is a commune in Buzău County, Muntenia, Romania, in the valley of the river Buzău. It is composed of five villages: Bărăști, Buda Crăciunești, Cislău, Gura Bâscei and Scărișoara.

The largest of the villages is Cislău with 2,305 people registered in 2009.   The corresponding numbers for the other four villages in 2009 were: 
Bărăști: 541 people 
Buda Crăciunești: 920 people
Gura Bâscei: 389 people
Scărișoara: 877 people.

The commune is positioned on the Buzău River at the point where it is joined by the Chiojdului River.  In terms of the road network, it is on the National Highway CN10 between Buzău (approximately 52 km / 32 miles away) and Braşov (approximately 110 km / 68 miles away). In one of the commune's villages, Gura Bâscei, Local Road CJ102B leads off the main road linking to the Zeletin Valley and Vălenii de Munte.

Notes

Communes in Buzău County
Localities in Muntenia